Butterfield House may refer to:

Butterfield House (New York City)
Grafton Public Library (Grafton, Vermont), also known as Butterfield House